The 2014 Skyrunning World Championships was the 2nd edition of the global skyrunning competition, Skyrunning World Championships, organised by the International Skyrunning Federation and was held in French side of Mont Blanc from 27 to 29 July 2014.

Results

Ultra SkyMarathon (80 km)

Men

Women

Vertical Kilometer

Men

Women

SkyMarathon (42 km)

Men

Women

References

External links
 International Skyrunning Federation official web site

Skyrunning World Championships